Margarita Melikovna Betova (née Gasparyan; , ; born 1 September 1994) is a Russian tennis player.

Betova has won two singles and four doubles titles on the WTA Tour, as well as nine singles and eight doubles titles on the ITF Circuit. On 15 February 2016, she reached her career-high singles ranking of world No. 41, while on 6 June 2016, she reached her best doubles ranking of No. 25.

In 2015, she won both her first singles and doubles titles during the same week, a feat she achieved at the Baku Cup. She was formerly coached by Elena Makarova, and is currently coached by Carlos Martinez.

Personal life
Born to an Armenian father, Melik, and a Russian mother, Lyudmila, Gasparyan began playing tennis at age five. Her father was for a time a weightlifter, while her mother a biathlonist. Margarita's home club is CSKA Moscow.

The 27-year-old Margarita married Belarusian tennis player Sergey Betov in July 2021; she announced her pregnancy in February 2022.

Career

2010–14: Early years
Gasparyan started her pro career at the $10k tournament in St. Petersburg in mid-March 2010, losing in the first qualification round. Her first successful appearance was in another $10k tournament in Minsk, reaching the quarterfinals in singles and semifinals in doubles, respectively. Her first final was in Tyumen in doubles with Natela Dzalamidze in the very end of 2011, losing 0–6, 2–6 to Darya Kustova and Olga Savchuk.

In 2012, Gasparyan won four singles titles on the ITF Circuit, all under the category $25k. All of her singles titles came from Russia. She was awarded a wildcard into the Kremlin Cup but lost to Lucie Šafářová, in three sets.

At the end of the 2013 season, Gasparyan was called by captain, Shamil Tarpischev, to be part of the Russian team for the Fed Cup Final against Italy, in early November. Afterwards, she won her fifth ITF title in Minsk.

The 2014 WTA Tour was for Gasparyan more productive especially by season's end in singles, while in doubles she improved as she won two major ITF tournaments out of four, one being a top-levelled tournament in Astana, Kazakhstan.

Gasparyan qualified for the Tashkent Open, but lost in the first round. She debuted at a Grand Slam tournament when she was in the qualifying draw at the US Open. At the end of the season, Gasparyan saw good results in Sharm El Sheikh, Egypt, winning one tournament.

2015: First WTA Tour titles, Grand Slam main-draw debut

Gasparyan won three ITF singles tournaments and one ITF doubles tournament, former being a top-level one. She achieved her first loss in an ITF final, also a $100k tournament, in Trnava, Slovakia, where she lost to Danka Kovinić. She then decided to play on the WTA Tour.

In May, Gasparyan made her Grand Slam main-draw debut at French Open, where she lost in two sets to Ana Konjuh as a qualifier. On June 29, she made her second Grand Slam main-draw entry as a qualifier at Wimbledon, where she faced No. 1 seed, Serena Williams, in the first round. She broke Williams' serve early in the first set, but lost the match after yielding 11 of the final 13 games of the match.

At the İstanbul Cup, Gasparyan was drawn to face eighth seed Tsvetana Pironkova after getting past the qualifying rounds. Despite winning the first set 6–0 and having two match points, she lost the match 6–0, 6–7, 6–7.
Gasparyan won her first WTA title in Baku, defeating Patricia Maria Țig in the final. She became the first one-handed backhand player to win in the 2015 WTA season. As a result, her singles ranking rose to a career-high No. 71. Gasparyan, also with her win in the doubles event alongside title defender Alexandra Panova, climbed to No. 84 in the doubles rankings.
At the Connecticut Open, she fell in the first round of qualifying to Christina McHale. She also fell in the qualifying rounds at the US Open, losing to American wildcard Jessica Pegula in straight sets.

Gasparyan then lost in the second round of the Tashkent Open to German Anna-Lena Friedsam, in straight sets. However, she won her second WTA doubles title of the year there with Alexandra Panova.
At the Ladies Linz, Gasparyan upset sixth seed Camila Giorgi in the second round, before losing to Friedsam again.
At the Kremlin Cup, Gasparyan upset ninth seed Kristina Mladenovic in the second round but fell to eventual finalist Anastasia Pavlyuchenkova in the quarterfinals.
In her last tournament of the year, Gasparyan reached the quarterfinals of the WTA Challenger Open de Seine-et-Marne, before retiring in the match against former Grand Slam champion Francesca Schiavone after losing the first set in a tiebreak.

Gasparyan ended the season as world No. 62, her first season ending in the top 100 and winning her first WTA singles title.

2016: Top 50, French Open doubles semifinal 

Gasparyan played in Brisbane, but fell in the final qualifying round. However, due to Maria Sharapova's withdrawal, Gasparyan was awarded a lucky loser spot. However, she lost in the first round to compatriot Ekaterina Makarova. In Hobart, Gasparyan lost in the second round to Johanna Larsson.

In the Australian Open, she managed to reach the fourth round, her best to date Grand Slam performance, after upsetting 17th seed, Sara Errani, in the first round. She then fell to world No. 1, Serena Williams, in straight sets.

At the inaugural St. Petersburg Trophy, Gasparyan reached the second round, before losing to fourth seed Ana Ivanovic.
In Doha, she caused a big upset by outclassing tenth seed Karolína Plíšková in just 49 minutes. However, she failed to keep up the good momentum as she lost to Andrea Petkovic.
At the Indian Wells Open, Gasparyan defeated Olga Govortsova in the first round but lost to ninth seed Roberta Vinci in the second round despite having two match points.

She debuted for Team Russia at the 2016 Fed Cup against Belarus in the World Group Play-offs.

After Wimbledon, Gasparyan underwent surgery due to an injury, after which she was not able to participate over a specific time period. Among the tournaments she skipped were the Summer Olympics, where she planned to partner with Kuznetsova in doubles.

2017–18: Recovery from injury, second WTA title and return to top 100 
Gasparyan came back to tennis in late 2017, participating in the qualifying rounds of the Kremlin Cup, after experiencing three knee surgeries.

In 2018, she reached the final of a $25k event in Spain, losing to Paula Badosa. She then entered her first WTA tournament since coming back from injury, the Jiangxi International Open in Nanchang, China, reaching the second round where she eventually lost to Zhang Shuai.

She was granted a protected ranking and entered the main draw of the US Open without having to qualify. In the first round, she was defeated by world No. 4, Angelique Kerber, in straight sets. Gasparyan became the second lowest-ranked player to win a WTA title when she won the Tashkent Open with a ranking of No.299, defeating Anastasia Potapova in the final. She also claimed top 100 wins over Tatjana Maria and Mona Barthel in the process, making her return to the top 200.

Gasparyan extended her winning streak at the Upper Austria Ladies Linz by reaching the quarterfinals, where she earned the first top-ten win of her career over Kiki Bertens in the second round. Another WTA quarterfinal appearance followed at the BGL Luxembourg Open, where she upset 7th seed Maria Sakkari in straight sets.

She ended her first full comeback season with back-to-back WTA 125 semifinals at the Mumbai Open and the Open de Limoges, returning to the top 100 for the first time since 2016.

2019: Return to top 60, first WTA Premier doubles title
Gasparyan started her season at the Australian Open where she reached the second round and lost to Elise Mertens in straight sets. She then successfully qualified for the main draw at the St. Petersburg Ladies' Trophy, but lost to former Grand Slam champion Victoria Azarenka in the first round. Despite her early exit in singles, she managed to win the biggest doubles title of her career alongside Ekaterina Makarova in St. Petersburg as an unseeded pair.

She reached her first quarterfinal of the year at the İstanbul Cup, where she upset second seed Mihaela Buzărnescu in three sets. She went on to defeat compatriot Veronika Kudermetova but retired in the semifinal against eventual champion Petra Martić. Gasparyan then lost in the first round of the Madrid Open to Simona Halep, before suffering another first-round exit at the French Open to Anna Blinkova.

Gasparyan returned stronger during the grass-court season, upsetting seventh seed Viktória Kužmová in the first round of the Rosmalen Grass Court Championships despite being two points away from defeat. She then stunned Elina Svitolina for her first top-ten win of the year at the Birmingham Classic. At Wimbledon, she was close to repeating her victory over Svitolina in the second round but was hampered by cramps and was forced to retire in the second set despite leading.

The Russian went on a winless run until the US Open, where she won her first match since July against Priscilla Hon in the first round. However, she won just one game in the second round against Johanna Konta. Gasparyan failed to defend her title at the Tashkent Open despite being the second seed, losing to Danka Kovinić in the second round. She made another WTA quarterfinal at the BGL Luxembourg Open but was forced to retire against Blinkova to end her season. As a result of not defending her WTA 125 tournament points, she ended the year outside the top 100.

2020: More injury struggles
Gasparyan began 2020 by successfully qualifying for the main draw at the Shenzhen Open, but lost to second seed Aryna Sabalenka in convincing fashion. She then suffered her first opening-round exit at the Australian Open in her career, going down to Maria Sakkari. She was on a four-match losing streak before the COVID-19 pandemic forced the tour to be suspended.

She returned to action at the Rosmalen Open but lost in the first qualifying round. She ended a six-match losing streak at the US Open, defeating former Olympic gold medalist Monica Puig in three sets, which was her second top 100 victory of the season. However, despite a tough fight, she lost to Serena Williams in a tight match in Arthur Ashe Stadium.

Held during the second week of the US Open, Gasparyan made the second round of the İstanbul Cup but was forced to retire against Rebecca Peterson due to an injury. She lost in the opening round of the French Open to Elise Mertens in straight sets.

2021: Resurgence, return to top 100 followed by a lengthy injury layoff 

Gasparyan started 2021 with a run to the final round of qualifying at the Australian Open, only losing to Tsvetana Pironkova in a close match. After she was given a lucky-loser spot, she lost to Garbiñe Muguruza in the first round.

She started to find some form when she qualified for the main draw at the Lyon Open and lost to Kristina Mladenovic in the second round. Handed a wildcard at the St. Petersburg Ladies' Trophy, Gasparyan exacted revenge for her loss against Mladenovic in the first round, losing just two games after dropping the opening set. She then beat Kateřina Siniaková for yet another top 100 win to reach her first WTA 500 quarterfinal since 2015. Continuing her good form, Gasparyan stunned top seed Ekaterina Alexandrova, in straight sets, before prevailing against fellow wildcard Vera Zvonareva to reach the biggest final of her career. However, injury caught up to her once again as Gasparyan was forced to retire in the final against Daria Kasatkina, after going down a set due to a back injury. With her run, she managed to return to the top 100 for the first time in over a year.

On her return to action at the Porsche Tennis Grand Prix, she was stunned by local wildcard Noma Noha Akugue, in the first round of qualifying. She endured through a five-match losing streak on clay, with her last match of the season being a comprehensive loss against Ann Li in the first round of the French Open, winning just one game. She was inactive for the rest of the year, falling out of the top 150 at the end of the season. Meanwhile, she got married in the summer of 2021 and announced her pregnancy in the early 2022.

2023: Comeback

Performance timelines

Only main-draw results in WTA Tour, Grand Slam tournaments, Fed Cup/Billie Jean King Cup and Olympic Games are included in win–loss records.

Singles
Current through the 2021 French Open.

Doubles
Current through the 2021 St. Petersburg Trophy.

WTA career finals

Singles: 3 (2 titles, 1 runner-up)

Doubles: 6 (4 titles, 2 runner-ups)

WTA 125 tournament finals

Doubles: 1 (runner-up)

ITF Circuit finals

Singles: 11 (9 titles, 2 runner–ups)

Doubles: 13 (8 titles, 5 runner–ups)

National representation

Team competition: 1 (runner-up)

Fed Cup/Billie Jean King Cup participation
This table is current through the 2019 Fed Cup

Singles: 2 (0–2)

Doubles: 3 (1–2)

Top 10 wins

Notes

References

External links

 
 
 

1994 births
Living people
Russian people of Armenian descent
Russian sportspeople of Armenian descent
Russian female tennis players
Universiade medalists in tennis
Tennis players from Moscow
Universiade silver medalists for Russia
Medalists at the 2013 Summer Universiade